Włodzimierz Tadeusz Stępień (born 24 October 1952 in Kielce) is a Polish politician. He was elected to the Sejm on 25 September 2005, getting 12655 votes in 33 Kielce district as a candidate from Democratic Left Alliance list.

See also
Members of Polish Sejm 2005-2007

References

1952 births
Living people
Politicians from Kielce
Members of the Polish Sejm 2005–2007
Democratic Left Alliance politicians
Mayors of places in Poland
Recipients of the Order of Polonia Restituta